The Socialist Revolutionary Party  (PSR) was a French Blanquist political party founded in 1898 and dissolved in 1901. It is indirectly one of the founding factions of the French Section of the Workers' International (SFIO), founded in 1905.

The PSR was the new name given, in 1898, to the Central Revolutionary Committee (CRC), a blanquist party founded in 1881. The CRC had been strengthened by the formation of the Revolutionary Communist Alliance (ACR) by dissident members of the reformist Revolutionary Socialist Workers' Party (POSR). Due to the support of the ACR, the PSR became the second largest Marxist political party in France behind the French Workers' Party.

The PSR was led by Édouard Vaillant, who sought to be the middle ground between moderate socialists (Jean Jaurès, Paul Brousse) and Marxists (Jules Guesde, Paul Lafargue). The PSR, however, later merged with the French Workers' Party (POF) to form the Socialist Party of France (PSdF). The PSdF was one of the two founding members of the French Section of the Workers' International (SFIO) in 1905.

Notable members
Madame Sorgue
Édouard Vaillant

See also

History of the Left in France
French Section of the Workers' International
Socialist Party of France
French Workers' Party

Defunct political parties in France
Political parties of the French Third Republic
History of socialism
Socialist parties in France
Second International
1898 establishments in France
Political parties established in 1898
1901 disestablishments in France
Political parties disestablished in 1901